The 1993 Torneo Internazionale Femminile di Palermo was a women's tennis tournament played on outdoor clay courts at the Country Time Club in Palermo, Italy that was part of the Tier IV category of the 1993 WTA Tour. It was the sixth edition of the tournament and was held from 6 July until 11 July 1993. Unseeded Radka Bobková won the singles title and earned $18,000 first-prize money.

Finals

Singles
 Radka Bobková defeated  Mary Pierce 6–3, 6–2
 It was Bobková's 2nd singles title of the year and of her career.

Doubles
 Karin Kschwendt /  Natalia Medvedeva defeated  Silvia Farina /  Brenda Schultz 6–4, 7–6(7–4)

References

External links
 ITF tournament edition details
 Tournament draws

Internazionali Femminili di Palermo
Internazionali Femminili di Palermo
1993 in Italian women's sport
Torneo